The Radical Philosophy Review is a peer-reviewed academic journal sponsored by the Radical Philosophy Association. It was established in 1998 and all issues are available online. The journal is published by the Philosophy Documentation Center.

Content 
The Radical Philosophy Review contains articles focusing on the discussion of fundamental social change. It promotes the idea that society should be built on cooperation rather than competition, and that social decision-making should be governed by democratic procedures.

On occasion, the journal publishes special issues or special sections focusing on a particular social or political issue. Past topics include NATO's war in Yugoslavia, the Second Intifada, radical theories and religion, and biopolitics and racism.

Notable contributors 

Samir Amin 
Giovanni Arrighi 
Hanan Ashrawi 
Noam Chomsky
Ward Churchill
Angela Davis
Enrique Dussel
Norman Finkelstein
Henry Giroux
Mumia Abu-Jamal
Edward Said

Abstracting and indexing 
The journal is abstracted and indexed in Academic Search Premier, Alternative Press Index, Current Abstracts, Humanities International Index, International Bibliography of Book Reviews of Scholarly Literature, International Bibliography of Periodical Literature, International Bibliography of the Social Sciences, MLA International Bibliography, Philosopher's Index, PhilPapers, SocINDEX, and TOC Premier.

See also

External links
 
Radical Philosophy Association

English-language journals
Political philosophy journals
Publications established in 1998
Political science journals
Biannual journals
Philosophy Documentation Center academic journals